Andrew Evans (born October 22, 1988) is a Canadian pair skater. With Carolyn MacCuish, he placed 8th at the 2007 World Junior Championships.

Personal life 
Evans was born on October 22, 1988, in Etobicoke, Ontario, Canada. He studied nanotech engineering at the University of Waterloo.

Career 
Evans originally competed as a single skater. He decided to concentrate on pairs after not making it to the Canadian nationals as a single skater. He teamed up with Carolyn MacCuish in March 2004.

MacCuish/Evans initially trained at the Canadian Ice Academy in Etobicoke, coached by Kim Hanford. Following their coach's retirement in March 2006, they moved to the Mariposa School of Skating in Barrie, where they were coached by Lee Barkell with assistance from Shane Dennison and Jacinthe Larivière. MacCuish/Evans won the novice bronze medal at the 2006 Canadian Championships and debuted on the ISU Junior Grand Prix circuit (JGP) later that year. After winning the 2007 Canadian national junior title, they finished 8th at the 2007 World Junior Championships in Oberstdorf, Germany. In the 2007–08 season, they won silver at the 2007 JGP in Lake Placid, New York after winning the free skate.

Evans later competed with Kirsten Moore-Towers and Julianne Séguin.

Programs 
(with MacCuish)

Competitive highlights
JGP: Junior Grand Prix

With Moore-Towers, Godin and Séguin

With MacCuish

References

External links

 
 

1988 births
Living people
Canadian male pair skaters
Sportspeople from Etobicoke